Jenkins Johnson Gallery is a contemporary art gallery owned and directed by Karen Jenkins-Johnson. The gallery exhibits a spectrum of influential artists from emerging to established. There are 2 gallery spaces: one in San Francisco and a project space in Brooklyn.

History of the Jenkins Johnson Gallery 
In 1996, Karen Jenkins-Johnson opened Jenkins Johnson Gallery in San Francisco. In 2005, the gallery opened a second space in Chelsea, NYC. The Chelsea space operated until 2014.

Jenkins Johnson Projects 
In 2017, Jenkins Johnson Gallery opened a community oriented project space emphasizing curators and artists of color - Jenkins Johnson Projects - in Prospect Lefferts Gardens, Brooklyn.

External links 

 Jenkins Johnson Gallery website

References

Art museums and galleries in San Francisco
Art museums and galleries in Brooklyn
Art galleries established in 1996
1996 establishments in California
Contemporary art galleries in the United States